Concordia is a locality at the western end of the Barossa Valley, South Australia, situated 5 km ENE of Gawler.

History
Concordia was a subdivision of section 465, Hundred of Barossa in 1877, and named after Concordia School, which had been opened by Frederick Sickovich in 1861 or earlier. It is situated north of the Barossa Valley Way, between Gawler and Sandy Creek and south of the North Para River. The current boundaries were set in 2003.

Manning asserts that it was named for Concordia, the Roman Goddess of Peace and Harmony, and is very commonly used in connection with Lutheran institutions.

The Concordia cemetery is located on the west side of Teusner Road.

References 

Towns in South Australia
Barossa Valley